Tantsud tähtedega 2011 is the fifth season of the Estonian version of Dancing with the Stars, and was broadcast on the Estonian television channel Kanal 2 starting on 9 October 2011. The hosts were Mart Sander and Liina Randpere. The judges were Merle Klandorf and Jüri Nael. Each week a former contestant joined them as the guest judge.

Couples

Scores

Red numbers indicate the lowest score for each week.
Green numbers indicate the highest score for each week.
 indicates the couple eliminated that week.
 indicates the returning couple that finished in the bottom two.
 indicates the winning couple.
 indicates the runners-up.

Highest and lowest scoring performances
The best and worst performances in each dance according to the judges' marks are as follows:

Averages 

The table does not include the Jive Marathon scores.

Couples' highest and lowest scoring dances

Songs and Individual Scoring

Week 1
 Guest judge: Argo Ader, bodybuilder & Tantsud tähtedega 2008 (Season 3) winner
Individual judges scores in charts below (given in parentheses) are listed in this order from left to right: Merle Klandorf, Jüri Nael and Argo Ader.

Running order

Week 2
 Guest judge: Vilja Savisaar-Toomast, Member of the European Parliament & Tantsud tähtedega 2006 (Season 1) contestant
Individual judges scores in charts below (given in parentheses) are listed in this order from left to right: Merle Klandorf, Jüri Nael and Vilja Savisaar-Toomast.

Running order

Week 3
 Guest judge: Lauri Pedaja, actor, Hairdresser & Tantsud tähtedega 2008 (Season 3) semi-finalist
Individual judges scores in charts below (given in parentheses) are listed in this order from left to right: Merle Klandorf, Jüri Nael and Lauri Pedaja.

Running order

Week 4
 Guest judge: Martin Parmas, Ballroom dancer, formerly on Tantsud tähtedega.
Individual judges scores in charts below (given in parentheses) are listed in this order from left to right: Merle Klandorf, Jüri Nael and Martin Parmas.

Running order

Week 5
 Guest judge: Kaisa Oja, Ballroom dancer & Tantsud tähtedega 2010 host
Individual judges scores in charts below (given in parentheses) are listed in this order from left to right: Merle Klandorf, Jüri Nael and Kaisa Oja.

Running order

Week 6
 Guest judge: Marko Mehine, Ballroom dancer, formerly on Tantsud tähtedega.
Individual judges scores in charts below (given in parentheses) are listed in this order from left to right: Merle Klandorf, Jüri Nael and Marko Mehine.

Running order

Week 7
 Guest judge: Veiko Ratas, Ballroom dancer, formerly on Tantsud tähtedega.
Individual judges scores in charts below (given in parentheses) are listed in this order from left to right: Merle Klandorf, Jüri Nael and Veiko Ratas.

Running order

Week 8
 Guest judge: Ants Tael, former Tantsud tähtedega judge.
Individual judges scores in charts below (given in parentheses) are listed in this order from left to right: Merle Klandorf, Jüri Nael and Ants Tael.

Running order

Dance Chart

 Highest scoring dance
 Lowest scoring dance
 Dance performed on the finale by previously eliminated couple

References

Season 2011
2010s Estonian television series
2011 Estonian television seasons
Estonian reality television series